Guatemala–Turkey relations are foreign relations between Guatemala and Turkey. Guatemala has an embassy in Ankara since April 19, 2017. Turkey has an embassy in Guatemala City since 2015.

Official Visits

Economic Relations

Trade volume between the two countries was US$63.5 million in 2019 (Turkish exports/imports: 53.5/10 million USD).

See also 

 Foreign relations of Guatemala
 Foreign relations of Turkey

References 

 
Turkey
Bilateral relations of Turkey